Final Reprisal is a 1988 action film directed by Teddy Page and starring Gary Daniels (in his first starring role) and James Gaines. It was shot in the Philippines, and released directly-to-video in the mid 1988.

Plot
Sergeant David Callahan leads a task force of U.S. Marines sent in behind enemy lines to perform a secret mission. The mission becomes a failure, when commandos kill the daughter of powerful Captain Vinai. Five years later Callahan lives in Thailand, and works as a secret adviser of the Thai Special Forces. Unfinished feuds from Callahan's past return, and the soldier is forced to come back to the Vietnamese P.O.W. camp he escaped years before, then fight off a deadly duel.

Cast
 Gary Daniels as Sergeant David Callahan
 James Gaines as Charles Murphy
 David Light as Douglas Anderson
 Richard King as Captain Vinai
 Protacio Dee as Tran Van Phu
 Oscar Daniels as The Colonel
 Hassim Hassam as El Chameleon
 Peter Rise as Paul Callahan

References

External links
 

1988 action films
1988 films
Films set in Thailand
Philippine action films
Films about the United States Marine Corps
Vietnam War films
Films shot in the Philippines
American action films
1980s English-language films
1980s American films